The 3rd Central Committee of the Lao People's Revolutionary Party (LPRP) was elected at the 3rd LPRP National Congress in 1982. It was composed of 49 members and six alternates.

Members

Alternates

References

Specific

Bibliography
Articles:
 

3rd Central Committee of the Lao People's Revolutionary Party
1982 establishments in Laos
1986 disestablishments in Laos